Solomon Islands is a sovereign nation state since 1978, formerly a British protectorate known as the British Solomon Islands. They comprise nearly 1,000 islands and lie to the south-east of Papua New Guinea.

The first mails from the islands are believed to be those sent by the British Resident Commissioner, Charles Woodford, who was appointed in 1896 and established an administrative centre at Tulagi. Letters were sent in a sealed bag to Sydney where New South Wales stamps were affixed. Later, a stock of New South Wales stamps was kept at Tulagi and the stamps were cancelled in Sydney. From April 1906, Woodford used a paid handstamp instead and stamps were again added in Sydney.

On 14 February 1907, the first postage stamps were issued in the Solomon Islands, marked British Solomon Islands Protectorate. 

From 1913, stamps were marked British Solomon Islands.

From 1975, leading up to independence in 1978, stamps were marked "Solomon Islands" and all stamps since then have been so marked.

References

Further reading
 Croom-Johnson, R.P. The stamps of the British Solomon Islands = Les timbres-poste des Îles Salomon. Torino: Editrice Filatelica, 1928, 17p.  
 Franks, Don and Peter Forrestier Smith. The Stamps and Postal History of the Solomon Islands: Illustrated check list of postal history items of the pre-Protectorate and the "Woodford" eras. London: Pacific Islands Study Circle, 2001, 170p.
 Gisburn, Harold. British Solomon Islands Protectorate: Its Postage Stamps and Postal History. Southampton: J. Sanders, 1956, 111p.  
 Proud, Edward. The Postal history of the British Solomon Islands and Tonga. Heathfield (E.Sussex): Proud-Bailey Co. Ltd, 2006 , 296p.
 The Solomon Islands Philatelic Guide. Honiara: British Solomon Islands Philatelic Bureau, 1972, 12p.

External links

Stamps of the Solomon Islands by Charlie B. Miller.

Philately of the Solomon Islands